Vazhayila is an prime city near Peroorkada. Located at Trivandrum District. The exact location is 2 to 3 kilometers from the kowdiar Palace. It comes under Vattiyoorkavu constituency. Vazhayila has 4-lane road, Petrol pumps, Car showroom, Sports club, Corporation water facility, High speed internet, Online Taxi and food services etc.. There are various shopping centers, Many Flat and villa Projects in it.

The famous Killi river, which is a tributary of the Karamana river, passes through Vazhayila.

It has an Auto rickshaw stand in the junction itself and a bus stop.

Connectivity 
Vazhayila is connected via Thiruvananthapuram-Thenmala Highway (S.H) to various places inside and outside the district like Karakulam, Nedumangad, Palode, Thenmala, Kuttalam etc. It also connects different places of Tamil Nadu like Thenkasi.

The city roads connect important places Peroorkada, Vattiyoorkavu, Aruvikkara, Mannanthala etc.

External links

GoogleMaps satellite

വഴയില 

Suburbs of Thiruvananthapuram